Frans Laporta (13 April 1907 – 16 August 2002) was a Belgian architect. His work was part of the architecture event in the art competition at the 1932 Summer Olympics.

References

1907 births
2002 deaths
20th-century Belgian architects
Olympic competitors in art competitions
People from Lier, Belgium